VA-83 has the following meanings:
Attack Squadron 83 (U.S. Navy)
State Route 83 (Virginia)